Franz Carl Müller-Lyer, born Francis Xavier Hermann Müller (5 February 1857 - 29 October 1916) was a German psychologist and sociologist. The Müller-Lyer illusion is named after him.

Life
Müller-Lyer was born in Baden-Baden. He studied medicine at the Universities of Strasbourg, Bonn, and Leipzig. He also studied psychology and sociology at the Universities of Berlin, Vienna, Paris and London.

In 1888 he entered into private practice in Munich.

The optical illusion he described in 1889 involves the perception of the length of a line when the ends are capped by chevrons. Diverging chevrons seem to make the line longer when compared with converging chevrons. There are numerous similar geometrical illusions known now.

Works
 Phasen der Kultur und Richtungslinien des Fortschritts, 1908. Translated by Elizabeth Coote Lake & Hilda Amelia Lake as The history of social development, London: G. Allen & Unwin Ltd, 1920.
 Der sinn des lebens und die wissenschaft. Grundlinien einer volksphilosophie, München: Lehman, 1910.
 Die Familie, München: J.F. Lehmann, 1911. Translated by Stella Browne as The family, London: G. Allen & Unwin, 1931.
 Formen der Ehe, der Familie und der Verwandstschaft, Müchen: J.F. Lehman, 1911.
 Phasen der Liebe : eine Soziologie des Verhältnisses der Geschlechter, München: A. Langen, 1913. Translated by Isabella Wigglesworth as The evolution of modern marriage: a sociology of sexual relations, London: George Allen & Unwin Ltd., 1929.
 Soziologie der leiden, München: A. Langen, 1914.
 Die Zähmung der Nornen, 2 vols., München: Albert Langen, 1918-1924. Edited by Betty Müller-Lyer.

References

1857 births
People from Baden-Baden
1916 deaths
German psychologists
German sociologists
German male writers